Perry Pelensky (born May 22, 1962) is a Canadian former professional ice hockey player who played four games in the National Hockey League with the Chicago Black Hawks during the 1983–84 season.

Career statistics

Regular season and playoffs

References

1962 births
Living people
Canadian ice hockey right wingers
Chicago Blackhawks draft picks
Chicago Blackhawks players
Fort Saskatchewan Traders players
Milwaukee Admirals (IHL) players
Portland Winterhawks players
Ice hockey people from Edmonton
Springfield Indians players